Ganapathi P. Raj Kumar of AIADMK party was the 5th mayor of Coimbatore city, Tamil Nadu from 2011-16. He succeeded S. M. Velusamy of All India Anna Dravida Munnetra Kazhagam as the mayor, by defeating his nearest rival Nandhakumar of Bharatiya Janata Party.

Mayoral election
In the mayoral elections of Coimbatore city in the year 2014, Ganapathi P. Raj Kumar  on the side of AIADMK defeated Nandhakumar of BJP with a distinct margin of 2.91 lakh votes. In this election both DMK and INC didn't participate.

AIADMK-supported Rajkumar won 420,104 votes whereas BJP supported Nandhakumar won only 128,761 votes. Than these both the Communist Party of India (Marxist)'s C. Padmanabhan managed only 31,000 votes in the election.

Ganapathi Raj Kumar was elected as Mayor of Coimbatore.

References

Mayors of Coimbatore